Pullman may refer to:

Places in the United States
Pullman, Chicago, Illinois
Pullman, Michigan
Pullman, Texas
Pullman, Washington
Pullman, West Virginia
Pullman Lake, a lake in Minnesota
Pullman neighborhood, in the city of Richmond, California

Surname
 Alberte Pullman (1920–2011), theoretical and quantum chemist, wife of Bernard
Alfred Pullman (1916–1954), a British soldier and airman
 Bernard Pullman (1919–1996), theoretical and quantum chemist, husband of Alberte
 Bill Pullman (born 1953), American actor
 George Pullman (1831–1897), founder of the Pullman Company
 Joe Pullman (1876–1955), Wales international rugby union player
 Lewis Pullman (born 1993), American actor
 Philip Pullman (born 1946), English writer
 Simon Pullman (1890–1942), violinist and founder of the Warsaw Ghetto Symphony Orchestra

Transport

Road
 Humber Pullman, a large automobile manufactured in central England between 1930 and 1954
 Mercedes-Maybach S600 Pullman Guard, German armoured limousine
 Pullman automobile by Pullman Motor Company, maker of automobiles in York, Pennsylvania, U.S. from 1905 to 1917
 Pullman Coaches, a bus operating company in Wales acquired by Veolia Transport Cymru, now Crossgates Coaches
 York Pullman, a bus operating company in Yorkshire, England, UK

Rail
 Pullman Company, maker of Pullman rail cars
 Pullman porter, a man hired by the Pullman Company to work as porter on sleeping cars
 Pullman Strike, a major American railroad strike in 1894
 Pullman train (UK), mainline luxury railway services in Great Britain

Both
 Pullman (car or coach), luxurious railway cars, cars, buses or coaches

Other uses
 Pullman (architecture), a long, narrow room
 Pullman (band), an American band formed in Chicago in the 1990s
 Pullman F.C., Pullman Company soccer team
 Pullman Hotels and Resorts, a brand part of the French AccorHotels group
 Pullman loaf, a long, square-edged loaf of bread
 Pullman Memorial Universalist Church, Albion, New York
 S. J. Pullman Stakes, a horse race at the former Cheltenham_Park_Racecourse in Adelaide, South Australia

See also
 Pulman (disambiguation)